The Arrest of a Pickpocket is an 1895 British short black-and-white silent crime film, produced and directed by Birt Acres  for exhibition on Robert W. Paul's peep show Kinetoscopes, featuring a policeman catching a pickpocket with the assistance of a passing sailor. The film was considered lost until footage from an 1896 Fairground Programme, originally shown in a portable booth at Hull Fair by Midlands photographer George Williams, donated to the National Fairground Archive was identified as being from this film.

References

External links 
 
 

1895 films
1890s British films
British black-and-white films
British silent short films
Films directed by Birt Acres
Pickpockets
1890s rediscovered films
British crime films
1890s crime films
Rediscovered British films
1895 short films